Jean E. Fox Tree is a professor in the Department of Psychology at the University of California at Santa Cruz.
Fox Tree studies collateral signals that people use in spontaneous speech, such as fillers (e.g. ‘you know’), prosodic information (e.g. pauses between words, the melody of a sentence), fillers (e.g. ‘uh’ and ‘um’), and speech disfluencies.

Traditionally, such phenomena were given little attention by scholars, either because they were viewed as flaws in speech to be avoided or ignored, or because many psycholinguistic studies focused on speech that was prepared in advance rather than spontaneous speech.   Rather than unwanted errors, Fox Tree's research has shown that collateral signals are actually meaningful and relevant to both speaker and listener, and that removing them from speech can negatively effect comprehension.

This view counters that proposed by Noam Chomsky, the well-known linguist from MIT who regarded such utterances as errors in performance and not part of proper language. Fox Tree showed, however, collateral signals are essential to successful communication in everyday situations and are beneficial to listeners.

Research

Fox Tree studied the use of ‘oh’ in several experiments.  They found that ‘oh’ can be used by speakers to signal to that the information they are providing is not connected to the information that just preceded it.  That is, while an utterance that follows another is usually connected to the one that preceded it, ‘oh’ can be used to signal that the utterance is not connected to the one that directly before it, but rather to something further back (for example “I went to the market and bought some fruit. I got apples, pears, grapes, and oranges. It was really crowded there today. Oh, and kiwis.”) (1999).

Fox Tree published two articles with Herb Clark, Professor of Psychology at Stanford University. In one paper, Clark and Fox Tree (2002) argued that 'uh' and 'um' are conventional English words that speakers use in distinct ways. While 'uh' is used to signal a short delay, 'um' is used to signal a longer delay in speaking.  Delays are interpreted as meaning different things, such as searching for a word, thinking of the next word to say, or holding or ceding the floor in speaking.  Fox Tree demonstrated online and offline effects of fillers in  2001 and 2002. In an earlier study, Fox Tree and Clark (1997) argued that the pronunciation of the word ‘the’ varies from the usual ‘thuh’ (rhyming with first syllable of ‘about’) to ‘thee’ (rhyming with ‘bee’) to signal difficulties in speech production.

Other topics that Fox Tree has researched include the use of expressions such as ‘you know’ and ‘I mean’, the effects of false starts and repetitions in the comprehension of spontaneous speech, the use of prosody in syntactic disambiguation, the interpretation of pauses in spontaneous speaking, and the recognition of verbal irony in spontaneous speech.

Fox Tree's work contributes both theory and data to many disciplines, such as computer technology and artificial intelligence (how machines can recognize and reproduce collateral signals), psychology (the role that collateral signals have in speech production and recognition), sociology (how various groups use collateral signals), linguistics (the structure and the function of collateral signals), and communication/media studies (the effect that the frequent editing of collateral signals from spontaneous radio talk might have on meaning).

References

Further reading

San Jose Mercury News West Magazine, "Leading Question: Jean E. Fox Tree" 
Science Today

External links
Fox Tree's Home Page at UCSC

Year of birth missing (living people)
Living people
Psycholinguists
American cognitive scientists
University of California, Santa Cruz faculty
American women psychologists
21st-century American women scientists